USS Bazely may refer to the following ships of the United States Navy:

 , a Union Navy ship, known by a shortened version of her original merchant name, J. E. Bazely
 , a World War II destroyer escort

References
 

United States Navy ship names